The Pinellas National Wildlife Refuge is part of the United States National Wildlife Refuge (NWR) System, located offshore from mainland St. Petersburg, Florida, and only accessible by boat.  The  refuge was established in 1951, to act as a breeding ground for colonial bird species. Islands within the refuge include Indian, Tarpon, Mule, and Jackass Keys, and all are within the St. Petersburg city limits.

Management
The Pinellas NWR is one of the three 'Tampa Bay Refuges', along with Passage Key NWR and Egmont Key NWR. Previously administered as a part of the Chassahowitzka National Wildlife Refuge Complex, the three Tampa Bay refuges, the Chassahowitzka NWR, and the Crystal River NWR have been administered by the Crystal River Complex, headquartered in Crystal River, Florida since 2012.

Fauna
Brown pelicans, herons, egrets, cormorants and many other species nest on the islands. Tarpon Key has the largest brown pelican rookery in the state.

Access
The NWR is closed to public use for the protection of natural and cultural resources.

References

External links
 National Wildlife Refuge

National Wildlife Refuges in Florida
Geography of St. Petersburg, Florida
Protected areas established in 1951
Protected areas of Pinellas County, Florida
Tourist attractions in St. Petersburg, Florida
1951 establishments in Florida